Werther is a 1986 Spanish drama film written and directed by Pilar Miró and starring Eusebio Poncela. It is a modern adaptation of Johann Wolfgang von Goethe's 1774 novel The Sorrows of Young Werther.
 
The film was entered into the main competition at the 43rd edition of the Venice Film Festival. It also won the award for best sound at the first edition of the Goya Awards.

Plot
In a coastal town in northern Spain, a young Greek teacher, Werther, lives alone in his ancestors' old house on the other side of the bay. He is a romantic and melancholic man who agrees to tutor the son of a wealthy shipowner, an introverted and difficult child. Werther will be attracted to the boy's mother, a strong and independent woman, and will no longer be able to live without him.

Cast 
 Eusebio Poncela  as Werther
 Mercedes Sampietro  as Carlota
 Féodor Atkine  as Alberto
 Emilio Gutiérrez Caba  as Federico
 Vicky Peña  as Beatriz
 Reinhard Kolldehoff

References

External links

    
1986 drama films
1986 films
Spanish drama films 
Films based on works by Johann Wolfgang von Goethe
Works based on The Sorrows of Young Werther
1980s Spanish-language films
1980s Spanish films